Quinebaug Valley Community College (QVCC) is a public community college in Danielson, Connecticut.

History 

Opened in September 1971, the college has an open admissions policy with 17 programs leading to Associate degrees and 24 certificate programs ranging from Allied Health to Technology Studies.

The main campus is at 742 Upper Maple Street in Danielson. In 1986, the Willimantic Center opened to offer residents in the southwestern corner of QVCC's service region access to the educational offerings of QVCC. The Willimantic Center closed at the Main Street location in 2018. For a short time, the College hosted courses in the evening at Windham Technical High School, Willimantic, CT. Classes are once again being offered at 729 Main Street in Willimantic.

In May 2014, the College opened a 38,000 square-foot wing, which houses the Quinebaug Middle College high school.  The wing contains Six new classrooms, two science labs, half gym, art room, special education room, fitness room, music room and two practice rooms, health suite, offices, and collaborative rooms.

The most recent expansion to the Danielson campus came in 2016, with the opening of the 10,000 square foot Advanced Manufacturing Technology Center for Eastern Connecticut.

Presidents & CEO 
The first president of QVCC was Dr. Robert E. Miller. He was succeeded in May 1992 by President Dianne E. Williams, who announced her retirement in the summer of 2009. Dr. Ross Tomlin succeeded her and served from 2010 until 2012. Dr. Miller returned as an interim president from 2012 to 2013, and Carmen Cid, dean of arts and sciences at Eastern Connecticut State University, served as interim president during 2013 and 2014. Carlee Drummer became the fourth president in July 2014.  

Dr. Rose Ellis became the QVCC Interim Campus Chief Executive Officer as of July 1, 2019. After a nationwide search, Dr. Karen Hynick became the permanent, and first, QVCC CEO as of July 2, 2021

References

External links
 Official website

 
Community colleges in Connecticut
Educational institutions established in 1971
Universities and colleges in Windham County, Connecticut
1971 establishments in Connecticut